Alberguinn is a Youth Hostel, located in Barcelona, Spain.

It was opened in March 2005 and has since catered to low-budget travelers visiting Barcelona. Alberguinn features 50 beds as shared dorm rooms.

It is located at the nice typical Sants district, 5 min walk from the main train  Station Barcelona Sants in Barcelona and 10 min walk from Barcelona's famous FC Barcelona soccer team stadium, Camp Nou

External links
Official website

Hostels
Buildings and structures in Barcelona